Kalati may refer to:
 Kalati, Kamyaran
 Kalati, Sanandaj

See also
 Kalateh (disambiguation)